Arman Shahdadnejad (born February 19, 1989) is an Iranian footballer goalkeeper who currently plays for Mes Kerman.

Club career

Mes Kerman
Shahdadnejad started his career with Mes Kerman.

Club career statistics

References

External links 
 Profile at theplayersagent.com
 Arman Shahdadnejad at PersianLeague.com

1989 births
Living people
Sanat Mes Kerman F.C. players
Iranian footballers
People from Kerman Province
Association football goalkeepers